Connell Run is a  long 2nd order tributary to the Youghiogheny River in Fayette County, Pennsylvania.  This is the only stream of this name in the United States.

Course
Connell Run rises about 1.5 miles west-southwest of Pleasant Hill, Pennsylvania, and then flows west to join the Youghiogheny River at Connellsville.

Watershed
Connell Run drains  of area, receives about 45.5 in/year of precipitation, has a wetness index of 339.82, and is about 70% forested.

Natural history
Connell Run is the location of Connell Run BDA.  The slopes on Connell Run provide habitat for a plant of special concern.

References

Tributaries of the Youghiogheny River
Rivers of Pennsylvania
Rivers of Fayette County, Pennsylvania
Allegheny Plateau